(Edith) Yvonne Jones  (born 1960) is director of the Cancer Research UK Receptor Structure Research Group at the University of Oxford and a Fellow of Jesus College, Oxford. She is widely known for her research on the molecular biology of cell surface receptors and signalling complexes.

Early life and education
Jones was born in 1960 in Oswestry, Shropshire, England. She was educated at Llanfyllin High School in Wales. She earned a Bachelor of Arts degree in Physics at the University of Oxford in 1982 as an undergraduate student of Jesus College, Oxford. She was awarded a Doctor of Philosophy degree from Oxford in 1985 for structural and dynamic studies of biological macromolecules supervised by Andrew Miller and David Chilton Phillips.

Research and career 
During postdoctoral research at the University of Edinburgh Jones performed neutron scattering experiments at the Institut Laue–Langevin in Grenoble to investigate the properties of collagen. She subsequently returned to Oxford to learn protein crystallography, and determined one of the first structures of a cytokine, tumour necrosis factor (TNF) with David Stuart. During her research, Jones contributed to the Medical Research Council (MRC) HIV/AIDS programs investigating the structure of reverse transcriptase for the development of antiviral drugs. In 1991 Yvonne started her own research laboratory at the University of Oxford funded by a Royal Society University Research Fellowship (URF) until 2001. In 1999 Yvonne co-founded the Division of Structural Biology (STRUBI) at Oxford. , she is joint head of STRUBI and Deputy Director of the Wellcome Trust Centre for Human Genetics.

Awards and honours
Jones was elected a Fellow of the Royal Society (FRS) in 2017. She was also elected a Fellow of the Academy of Medical Sciences (FMedSci) in 2003, awarded the Descartes Prize by the European Union in 2002 and awarded EMBO Membership in 2007.

References

British molecular biologists
Female Fellows of the Royal Society
Fellows of the Royal Society
Fellows of the Academy of Medical Sciences (United Kingdom)
Members of the European Molecular Biology Organization
Living people
1960 births